Cricket is one of the most popular sports in England, and has been played since the 16th century. Marylebone Cricket Club, based at Lord's, developed the modern rules of play and conduct. The sport is administered by the England and Wales Cricket Board and represented at an international level by the England men's team and England women's team. At a domestic level, teams are organised by county, competing in tournaments such as the County Championship, Royal London One-Day Cup, T20 Blast and the Women's Twenty20 Cup. Recent developments include the introduction of a regional structure for women's cricket and the establishment of The Hundred for both men's and women's cricket. Recreational matches are organised on a regional basis, with the top level being the ECB Premier Leagues.

History

History of cricket to 1725
 History of cricket (1726–1763)
 Overview of English cricket (1816–1863)
 History of English cricket from 1919 to 1939

Domestic competitions

In men's cricket, there are eighteen professional county clubs, seventeen of them in England and one in Wales. All eighteen counties are named after, and were originally representative of, historic counties. These clubs are heavily dependent on subsidies from the England and Wales Cricket Board, which makes its money from television and endorsement contracts and attendances at international matches. The English cricket season traditionally starts at the beginning of April and runs through to the second half of September although in recent years counties have played pre season friendly matches at the very end of March.

Each summer the county clubs compete in the first class County Championship, which consists of two divisions and in which matches are played over four days. The same teams also play one day cricket in the Royal London One-Day Cup, and Twenty20 cricket in the Vitality T20 Blast.

The National Counties Cricket Championship is a season-long competition in England for county clubs that do not have first-class status. There are nineteen teams representing historic English counties along with a Welsh minor counties team.

Below the county game, there are a raft of club competitions organised on a regional basis. ECB Premier Leagues being the highest level. There are also non-ECB-affiliated leagues such as the Bradford Cricket League, the Lancashire League and the Central Lancashire League.

In women's cricket, 36 teams, mainly representing counties, currently compete in the Women's Twenty20 Cup. The Women's County Championship, a one-day competition, was also competed for by counties until it ended in 2019. In 2016 the Women's Cricket Super League was established, a Twenty20 competition with six franchise teams. The Women's Cricket Super League was replaced in 2020 with a new regional domestic structure for women's cricket. This included eight teams each representing a region of England and Wales, and competing in the 50-over Rachael Heyhoe Flint Trophy from 2020 and the Twenty20 Charlotte Edwards Cup from 2021.

First-class counties
The eighteen first-class counties are the top level men's cricket teams. They are named after historic English counties and include one Welsh county, Glamorgan. 

The English first-class counties are:

Derbyshire
Durham
Essex
Glamorgan
Gloucestershire
Hampshire
Kent
Lancashire
Leicestershire
Middlesex
Northamptonshire
Nottinghamshire
Somerset
Surrey
Sussex
Warwickshire
Worcestershire
Yorkshire

The full name of the cricket team is usually formed from the name of the county followed by the words County Cricket Club, which are often abbreviated as CCC.

Derbies

The following games are considered derbies:-

Roses Match – Yorkshire v Lancashire
Battle of London (Cross-Thames Derby) – Middlesex v Surrey
South Coast Special – Hampshire v Sussex
West Midlands Derby – Warwickshire v Worcestershire
West Country Derby – Somerset v Gloucestershire
East Midlands Derby – Notts v Derbyshire
North Derby – Yorkshire v Durham

MCC 
The opening first-class game of an English county cricket season has traditionally been played at Lord's between the MCC and the Champion County (the club that won the County Championship the previous year). When the Marylebone Cricket Club (MCC) plays against one of the first-class counties, the game is granted first-class status.

University matches 
Oxford and Cambridge universities played their first match against each other in 1827. After the advent of first class cricket, matches between Oxford and Cambridge, and between either of those two universities and another first class side, were considered first class matches, with the status applied retroactively to earlier matches. Counties started playing matches at other universities in the 1980s, the first being Nottinghamshire vs Durham University at The Racecourse in 1981, but these were not granted first class status.

The first University Centre of Cricketing Excellence (UCCE) was established at Durham University by Graeme Fowler in 1996. The success of the Durham centre led to it being adopted as a national model by the ECB in October 2000, with the establishment of six UCCE sides (two – Durham and Loughborough – based around a single university; the others bringing together players from multiple institutions) playing from 2001 in a two-day match competition with a final at Lord's. From 2001 the Oxford and Cambridge matches against the counties were no longer considered first class games, but each UCCE played three early-season matches against county sides, which acted as pre-season warm-ups for the counties, and for Oxford, Cambridge and Durham UCCEs these were considered first class. Matches between counties and Loughborough UCCE were considered first class from 2003.

The MCC took over funding of the scheme from 2005, and from 2010 the UCCEs were rebranded as MCC University (MCCU) teams. A further re-arrangement in 2012 granted first-class status to all six MCCUs, but only for two of the three matches against county sides each season.

The MCC ceased funding the programme in 2020, with the organisation transferring back to the ECB. The matches between the MCCUs and counties, and the annual University Match between Oxford and Cambridge, were no longer considered first class matches after 2020. No MCCU matches were played in 2020 due to COVID, although the last first class Oxford-Cambridge match was played that September.

As of 2022, pre-season matches with first class counties are played under the name of "English University Matches" (according to the ECB website, although Wisden uses the term ECB University Matches), and Exeter has been added to the universities participating. Both the ECB and Wisden list the university teams participating in these pre-season matches as MCCUs, but they compete in British Universities and Colleges Sport (BUCS) limited-over matches as UCCEs. Inter-university matches outside of BUCS and the Oxford-Cambridge match have not, as of 2022, resumed after COVID.

The university teams that have played first-class cricket,  the dates when they held that status, the universities they represented and the number of first class matches played are:

Teams representing a single university:
 Cambridge University CC: 1817a–2020, Cambridge University, 1479 matchesb
 Oxford University CC: 1827a–2020, Oxford University, 1366 matchesb
 Durham UCCE/MCCU: 2001-2020, Durham University, 48 matches
 Loughborough UCCE/MCCU: 2003-2020, Loughborough University, 41 matches
a Date of earliest first class match listed on the Cricket Archive; formal first class status from 1895.
b Includes matches prior to 1895 regarded as first class by the Cricket Archive; see .

Teams representing multiple universities:
 Oxford and Cambridge Universities cricket team: 1839a–1992, Oxford and Cambridge university; 18 matchesb
 Combined Universities/British Universities cricket team: 1993–2006, all UK universities; 13 matches
 Cambridge UCCE/MCCU: 2001–2020, Cambridge and Anglia Ruskin universities, 48 matches
 Oxford UCCE/MCCU: 2001-2020, Oxford and Oxford Brookes universities, 47 matches
 Cardiff MCCU: 2012-2020, Cardiff, Cardiff Met and South Wales universities, 16 matches
 Leeds/Bradford MCCU: 2012-2020, Leeds, Leeds Beckett and Bradford universities and Bradford College, 14 matches
a Date of earliest first class match listed on the Cricket Archive; formal first class status from 1895.
b Includes two matches prior to 1895 regarded as first class by the Cricket Archive; see .

The Oxford and Cambridge Universities team played 18 first class matches against touring sides from 1839 to 1992, including two before official first class status started in 1895. The Combined Universities (British Universities from 1995) team, formed originally from Oxford and Cambridge but including other universities from 1987, played in the limited overs Benson & Hedges Cup from 1975 to 1998 and played 13 first class matches against touring sides from 1993 to 2006. The MCC Universities team (formed from the six MCCUs) played various matches from 2007 to 2017, including entering the Second XI Championship from 2009 to 2017.

Women's Domestic Regional Hubs
The eight women's teams represent "regional hubs" and are partnered with the counties in their region. Each team has at least six professionally contracted players.

 Central Sparks – Herefordshire, Shropshire, Staffordshire, Warwickshire & Worcestershire
 Lightning – Derbyshire, Leicestershire, Lincolnshire, Nottinghamshire & Loughborough University
 Northern Diamonds – Durham, Northumberland & Yorkshire
 North West Thunder – Cheshire, Cumbria & Lancashire
 South East Stars – Kent & Surrey
 Southern Vipers – Berkshire, Buckinghamshire, Dorset, Hampshire, Oxfordshire, Sussex & Isle of Wight Cricket Board
 Sunrisers – Bedfordshire, Cambridgeshire, Essex, Hertfordshire, Huntingdonshire, Middlesex, Norfolk, Northamptonshire, Suffolk & Marylebone Cricket Club
 Western Storm – Cornwall, Devon, Glamorgan, Gloucestershire, Somerset, Wiltshire & Cricket Wales

The Hundred

Originally scheduled to start in the 2020 season but postponed until 2021 due to the COVID-19 pandemic, the Hundred is a 100 ball cricket competition which consists of eight city-based franchise teams, each of which field both a men's and women's team, in a league format.

 Birmingham Phoenix
 London Spirit
 Manchester Originals
 Northern Superchargers
 Oval Invincibles
 Southern Brave
 Trent Rockets
 Welsh Fire

Recreational club competitions

The ECB runs a national club knock-out competition, the ECB National Club Cricket Championship, and has in place a regional Premier League pyramid system for recreational club cricket in England and Wales.

Cricket grounds

The cricket grounds of England and Wales are smaller than the largest in some other countries, especially India and Australia, but the best of them have been modernised to a high standard, and two new international grounds have been built in recent years. The largest English cricket ground, Lord's in London, is internationally regarded as the "home of cricket".

Test matches have been played at 24 grounds across the country. Five of these grounds have hosted both men's and women's Tests in their history: The Oval (South London), Old Trafford (Manchester), Trent Bridge (Nottingham), Headingley (Leeds) and Edgbaston (Birmingham).

The other grounds to have hosted a Test match since 2010 are Sir Paul Getty's Ground (Wormsley Park), St Lawrence Ground (Canterbury), County Ground, Taunton, Bristol County Ground, Sophia Gardens (Cardiff), the Rose Bowl (Southampton) and Riverside Ground (Chester-le-Street).

Governing body
The England and Wales Cricket Board (ECB) is the governing body of cricket in England and Wales. It was created on 1 January 1997 combining the roles of the Test and County Cricket Board (TCCB), the National Cricket Association (NCA) and the Cricket Council.

They are full members of the International Cricket Council.

National teams

In men's cricket, England is a founding Test cricket, One Day International and Twenty20 nation. England played in the first ever Test match in 1877 (against Australia in Melbourne) and the first ever One Day International in 1971 (also against Australia in Melbourne).

Each summer foreign national teams visit England to play Tests, One Day Internationals and Twenty20 Internationals. In the British winter the England team tours abroad. The highest profile rival of the England cricket team is the Australian team, with which it competes for The Ashes, one of the most famous trophies in British sport.

In women's cricket, England played in the first Women's Test series against Australia in 1934–35. They won the first Women's Cricket World Cup in 1973, and again in 1993, 2009 and 2017. They played in the first ever Twenty20 International for either gender, against New Zealand at Hove, and they won the inaugural World Twenty20 in 2009.

Popularity
In 2005 the ECB concluded a commercial arrangement with BSkyB which gave Sky the exclusive television rights for live Test cricket in England for four years (the 2006 to 2009 seasons). This deal, which took live Test cricket for home England matches away from terrestrial television for the first time generated substantial future revenues for English cricket, but was criticised by many England cricket supporters and others.

The Cricket Writers' Club Young Cricketer of the Year is an annual award voted by the Cricket Writers' Club for the best young cricket player in England and Wales, and has been awarded since 1950.

Cricket is also one of the most popular participation sports in England after football, rugby and tennis with most villages running a side every Sunday through the season, and towns putting out 2, 3, 4 and occasionally 5 sides for Saturday league matches, and 1 or 2 sides on a Sunday. According to the mid year 2020-21 Active Sport England survey an estimated 181,500 people play cricket at least twice a month, a 0.4% fall compared to the previous year. Around 65% population of England follow Cricket.

Bibliography

See also
Sport in England
Cricket in Wales
Cricket in Scotland
Cricket in Ireland

References